Ruggero Ravenna (born 1925) was an Italian trade unionist and syndicalist.

In 1950, he was one of the founders of Italian Labour Union (UIL), which is one of the biggest Italian trade union centres. He was general secretary of UIL from 27 October 1969 to 27 October 1971

See also
Italian Labour Union

Notes

External links
 UIL official page
 CNEL official page

1925 births
Italian trade unionists
Italian syndicalists
Possibly living people